Frank Mruk is an architect, author, artist and strategist. His research explores the nature of strategy in the creative pursuit of competitive advantage and innovation. He served as the executive director of the New York Center for Strategic Innovation and the Boston Center for Smart Building Technology.

Education 
He was educated at Pratt Institute, Pace University and at the University of Oxford. He has taught at the School of Visual Arts, the Rhode Island School of Design, Roger Williams University, the Parsons School of Design, New York University, and at the New York Institute of Technology where he served as associate dean for the School of Architecture and Design and has been a lecturer/visiting critic at the WE School, the United Nations, Oxford Brooks University, the University of Chile, the Fashion Institute of Technology, MIT, Columbia University, Harvard University and at Yale University. In 2021, he was ranked by Academic Influence in the top 1% in the world in both the Architecture and Engineering professions.

Frank studied with Lebbeus Woods and Raimund Abraham. He also worked for Cuban cinematographer Nestor Almendros during the filming of Heartburn with Meryl Streep and Jack Nicholson. He spent 10 years working on Wall Street for Maurice Greenberg at American International Group and later at Morgan Stanley, and in professional practice for the Aga Kahn (AKAA) winning Architect Emre Arolat and earlier for William Breger, past Dean of the New York School of Interior Design.

Career 
He has consulted for the Rhode Island Office of Innovation, Apple Computer and has served as President of the RI American Institute of Architects, the NY Association for Strategic Planning, and the NY Construction Specifications Institute. Frank was elevated to Fellowship in both the Strategic Planning Society and the American Institute of Architects. He has been a frequent lecturer on the topics of strategy and innovation. He co-authored two of the world's largest and most influential standards for Competitive Advantage and Strategic Management, the Association for Strategic Planning's Strategic Planning and Strategic Management Body of Knowledge and its Certification Exam Study Guide and the Institute for Management Accounting's Certified in Strategy and Competitive Analysis program.

He has been a vocal contributor to numerous efforts focused on the rethinking of suburbia, the profession and on issues of design practice. Mruk is also known for his efforts on transforming the built environment via competitions, sustainability and resiliency efforts, and international urban interventions, including representing the U.S. at two major interdesigns: Sweden's City Move in 2009 and Mumbai's Humanizing the Metropolis in 2014. In 2015–2016, he worked on the restoration of Le Corbusier's Villa Stein outside of Paris with Judith Dimaio and NYIT students, assisting Pierre Antoine Gaiter, Chief Architect for the Monuments of France. He has been an organizer, contributor and speaker at numerous events: TEDx, DESIGNxRI, TEDxNYIT, TEDxFallRiver, and the TED Global Oxford conference in 2009.

Bibliography
 Co-Author, Association for Strategic Planning (ASP) Body of Knowledge 2.0 – Guide to the Strategic Planning and Strategic Management Body of Knowledge. 2015 Second Edition. Association for Strategic Planning. 
 Contributor to Harriss, H., & Widder, L., Architecture live projects: Pedagogy into practice. 2014. Routledge. 
 Co-Author, Association for Strategic Planning (ASP) Certification Exam Study Guide. 2011 Second Edition. Strategy Professional Resource Center.

Notes

Alumni of the University of Oxford
Living people
People from New York (state)
People from Rhode Island
20th-century American architects
Pace University alumni
Pratt Institute alumni
Year of birth missing (living people)
21st-century American architects